Hans Judenkönig (also Judenkunig or Judenkünig) (c. 1450 – 4 March 1526) was a German lutenist of the Renaissance. He was born in Schwäbisch Gmünd and died in Vienna.

He worked as a lutenist in the vicinity of the University of Vienna and was best known for his two lute books written for the self-teaching of a lay audience.

Works 
 Utilis et compendiaria introductio, qua ut fundamento iacto quam facillime musicum exercitium, instrumentorum et lutine, et quod vulgo Geygen nominant, addiscitur Vienna ca. 1515/1519
 Ain schone kunstliche Underweisung in disem Büechlein, leychtlich zu begreyffen den rechten Grund zu lernen auff der Lautten und Geygen Vienna 1523

Recording 
 1994 - The Renaissance Lute - Ronn McFarlane - Dorian DOR-90186 contains five tracks by Judenkönig:
Madonna katerina
Christ ist erstanden (Christ is risen)
Und wer er nit erstanden (And who is not risen)
Der hoff dantz
Der hoff dantz (Nach tantz)

Further reading 
 Kurt Dorfmüller: Studien zur Lautenmusik in der ersten Hälfte des 16. Jahrhunderts (Tutzing, 1967)
Transcribed for classical guitar, and recorded by Eric Alan Heil. 16th-century court music.

References

External links 
 

1450s births
1526 deaths
Year of birth uncertain
15th-century Austrian people
15th-century German people
16th-century Austrian people
16th-century German musicians
Composers for lute
German classical composers
German expatriates in Austria
German lutenists
Musicians from Vienna
People from Schwäbisch Gmünd
Renaissance composers
German male classical composers